The Henie Onstad Kunstsenter is an art museum located at Høvikodden in Bærum municipality in Viken county, Norway.

History
The artcentre was founded in 1968 by World and Olympic champion figure skater Sonja Henie (1912–1969) and her husband, shipping magnate and art collector Niels Onstad (1909–1978). Their private collection of contemporary art, total 110 images, as well as funds for construction and operation of the centre was donated by the couple in 1961, when the Sonja Henie and Niels Onstad Foundation was created. The centre, designed by Norwegian architects Jon Eikvar and Sven Erik Engebretsen, also contains Sonja Henie's award collection.

In 1994, the building was extended, and a two-story wing with exhibition spaces and technical rooms was added. This project was designed by the same architects—the new wing abuts the main body of the building as an organic extension. In 2003, another extension was made, this time in the form of an annex that extends into the outdoor park, connected to the main building by a passage leading from the lower level. In addition to six exhibition halls, the Centre also has an auditorium and  smaller meeting rooms. Today, the total building area is approximately 9,500 square metres, of which 3,500 are occupied by exhibition spaces.

Present
Henie Onstad Kunstsenter organizes exhibitions and performances. Art center is visited by around 100,000 people each year. The centre celebrated its 40th anniversary in 2008 with exhibitions, seminars, book, concert and movie titled Høvikodden LIVE.

In 2019 the Henie Onstad Kunstsenter hosted the first FIDE World Fischer Random Chess Championship.

Controversy
After being identified in an exhibition catalogue in 2012 by the family of noted French-Jewish art dealer Paul Rosenberg, it was demanded that the HOK return Profil bleu devant la cheminée (Woman in Blue in Front of Fireplace) (1937), a Matisse painting that was confiscated by the Nazis in 1941. Museum Director Tone Hansen said the museum did not know the painting was stolen by the Nazis, until it was notified by the Rosenberg family.

Rosenberg had bought the painting direct from Matisse in 1937, and had it stored at the time of the 1940 Nazi invasion of France in a bank vault in Libourne, a commune in the Gironde department in Aquitaine, southwestern France. The Einsatzstab Reichsleiter Rosenberg entered the vault in March 1941 to confiscate the art pieces, and after cataloging at Galerie nationale du Jeu de Paume in September 1941, it was designated to the private collection of Hermann Göring. Then via various dealers during the Nazi period, post-war in the late 1940s it was bought by Niels Onstad from the Paris-based dealer Henri Bénézit. It has since appeared in numerous publications, and toured the world on several occasions. Although under Norwegian law, due to the period of ownership the painting now belongs to HOK, Norway was one of 44 signatories to the 1998 Washington Conference Principles on Nazi-Confiscated Art. Protracted mediation, overseen by Christopher A. Marinello, saw the painting returned to the heirs of Paul Rosenberg in March 2014.

As a result, the Henie Onstad Kunstsenter launched a Provenance Project.

References

Other sources
Hellandsjø,  Karin  The Henie Onstad Art Centre: The Art of Tomorrow Today : The Collection   (Torino: Skira, 2008)

External links
Official site

Art museums and galleries in Norway
Museums in Viken
1968 establishments in Norway
Art museums established in 1968
Biographical museums in Norway
Buildings and structures in Bærum
Modernist architecture in Norway